The Remix Suite (digital title: Michael Jackson: The Remix Suite) is a compilation of remixed hits by singer Michael Jackson. Although labeled as a Michael Jackson release, the majority of remixes are of hits during his tenure with The Jackson 5. Starting from August 25, five remixes each were released digitally as "suites" via iTunes, AmazonMP3 and Rhapsody every two weeks. It is the fifth album to be released since Jackson's death. The first suite leaked online two weeks before its intended digital release.

Track listings
Below are tracks from the two editions of the CD, and then the tracks from the EPs, numbered according to suite number.

Promo Only Mixes:

"I Want You Back" (Blame Remix - Radio Edit) 3:30

"ABC" (Verde Remix) 5:37

Unreleased remixes
The compilation, when news was originally released, was titled The Remix Suites: I–V, as a fifth EP was scheduled for release October 20, with the physical release a week later on the 27th. The plans were later changed to have the physical release come out on the 20th, and the last EP was presumably shelved. The press release via MySpace includes details of remixes that could have been on the compilation, such as Jason Nevins doing "I'll Be There", Theron Feemster doing "I Wanna Be Where You Are", and Tricky Stewart doing "I Want You Back".

The page also mentions the participation of Swizz Beatz, Q-Tip, Ryan Leslie and Rodney Jerkins, but it was not revealed what songs they have done. The Classic Motown page had also mentioned Jim Jonsin, Rico Love, Colin Munroe and Eric Hudson.

Release dates

References

External links
Official website
Michael Jackson Remix Suite on MySpace

2009 compilation albums
2009 remix albums
Michael Jackson compilation albums
Universal Music Group compilation albums
Universal Music Group remix albums
Motown compilation albums
Motown remix albums
Compilation albums published posthumously
Remix albums published posthumously